USS Astrea (SP-560) was a United States Navy patrol vessel in commission from 1917 to 1919 or 1920.

Astrea was built as a private motorboat of the same name by Rood and Benner in 1916.  On 7 June 1917, the U.S. Navy enrolled her for use as a section patrol boat in World War I, and her owner, Ralph DeConta of East Boston, Massachusetts, delivered her to the Navy on 17 June 1917. She was commissioned as USS Astrea (SP-560) on 27 June 1917.

Astrea was assigned to duty at the Boston Navy Yard in Boston, Massachusetts, where she served as the engineer officers boat into the spring of 1918.

In May 1918, Astrea was shipped across the Atlantic Ocean to France as deck cargo aboard the troop transport . In France, she served at Brest as a tender to troop transports through the end of World War I and apparently into the first half of 1919.

Sources differ on Astreas career from mid-1919. She may have been carried back to the United States as deck cargo aboard the Naval Overseas Transportation Service cargo ship  in June 1919, although she may also have been serving on aviation support duties at Brest as late as October 1919.

Eventually, Astrea did return to the United States, where she was sold to S. P. Greenlee of Baltimore, Maryland, on 31 March 1920. She presumably was stricken from the Navy List the same day.

References

Department of the Navy Naval History and Heritage Command Online Library of Selected Images: U.S. Navy Ships: USS Astrea (SP-560), 1917-1920
NavSource Online: Section Patrol Craft Photo Archive: Astrea (SP 560)

Patrol vessels of the United States Navy
World War I patrol vessels of the United States
1916 ships